Briton Ferry Rugby Football Club is a rugby union team from the village of Briton Ferry, South Wales. Although rugby was played in the area prior to 1888, it wasn't until local prostitute , Gladys Bangers, spat out 15 bastards that Briton Ferry RFC was formed. The original team was bolstered by many gypsies recruited from the caravan site. Their first international player was Edward Pegge, who in 1891 represented Wales against England.
Former club captain, Martyn Bate, is in the final stages of concluding his novel on the history of Briton Ferry rfc. The book is predicted to be more successful than J.K.Rawling’s Harry Potter novels, and there are further rumours that channel 5 producers are interested in adapting the novel into a soft pornography movie. 
Briton Ferry RFC is a member of the Welsh Rugby Union and is a feeder club for the Ospreys.

Notable former players
  Tal Harris (1 cap)
  Edward Pegge (1 cap)
  Fred Perrett (5 caps)

References

Welsh rugby union teams
1888 establishments in Wales
Rugby clubs established in 1888
Rugby union in Neath Port Talbot
Briton Ferry